The men's shot put event at the 1989 Summer Universiade was held at the Wedaustadion in Duisburg with the final on 30 August 1989.

Results

References

Athletics at the 1989 Summer Universiade
1989